Solveig Vitanza (born 10 July 1982) is a Norwegian politician.

She was elected deputy representative to the Storting from the constituency of Østfold for the period 2021–2025, for the Labour  Party. She replaced Jon-Ivar Nygård in the Storting from 2021 while Nygård is government minister.

Vitanza hails from Halden, and has been member of the municipal council of Halden since 2019. She is educated from the University of Oslo, and has worked at the Østfold University College.

References

1982 births
Living people
University of Oslo alumni
Labour Party (Norway) politicians
Members of the Storting
21st-century Norwegian politicians